Arkhangelskoye is a rural locality (a selo) and the administrative center of Arkhangelskoye Rural Settlement, Khokholsky District, Voronezh Oblast, Russia. The population was 509 as of 2010. There are 14 streets.

Geography 
Arkhangelskoye is located 54 km southeast of Khokholsky (the district's administrative centre) by road. Novovoronezh is the nearest rural locality.

References 

Rural localities in Khokholsky District